Bruno Bernhard Granichstaedten (September 1, 1879, Vienna – May 30, 1944, New York City) was an Austrian composer and librettist. He composed sixteen operettas and music for various films. He contributed the song "Zuschau'n kann i net" to the musical play The White Horse Inn. He emigrated from Austria, ending up in the United States of America in 1940, where he was only able to earn his living by playing the piano at night clubs.

Works
Bub oder Mädel? ( and Adolf Altmann), operetta, prologue and 2 acts (13 November 1908 Vienna, Johann Strauss-Theater)
Wein, Weib and Gesang (Adolf Altmann), operetta 1 act (1909 Vienna)
Lolotte (Bruno Granichstaedten and Alfred Schick-Markenau), operetta 3 acts (1910 Vienna)
Majestät Mimi (Felix Dörmann and Roda Roda), operetta (1911 Vienna)
Casimirs Himmelfahrt (Arthur Maria Willner and Robert Bodanzky), burlesque operetta (1911 Vienna)
Die verbotene Stadt (Bruno Granichstaedten and Karl Lindau, operetta (1913 Berlin)
Der Kriegsberichterstatter (Rudolf Österreicher and ), bunte Bilder vom Tage (1914 Vienna) (Music: Eysler, Granichstaedten, Nedbal, Weinberger and Ziehrer)
Auf Befehl der Herzogin (der Kaiserin) ( and Robert Bodanzky), operetta 3 acts (20 March 1915 Vienna, Theater an der Vienna)
Walzerliebe (Bruno Granichstaedten and Robert Bodanzky), operetta, prologue and 2 acts (16 February 1918 Vienna, Apollo Theater)
Das alte Lied (Bruno Granichstaedten), operetta 3 acts (1918 Vienna)
Indische Nächte (Robert Bodanzky and ), operetta 3 acts (1921 Vienna)
Die Bacchusnacht (Bruno Granichstaedten and Ernst Marischka), operetta 3 acts (1923 Vienna)
Glück bei Frauen (Viktor Léon and ), operetta (1923 Vienna)
Der Orlow (Bruno Granichstaedten and Ernst Marischka), operetta (3 April 1925 Vienna, Theater an der Wien)
Das Schwalbennest (Bruno Granichstaedten and Ernst Marischka), Old-Vienna-Singspiel 3 acts (1926 Vienna)
Evelyne (Bruno Granichstaedten and Peter Herz, after E. Phillips Oppenheim), operetta 3 acts (1927 Berlin)
Der Dollar rollt! (Reklame!) (Bruno Granichstaedten and Ernst Marischka), operetta (1930 Vienna)

Selected filmography
 The Orlov, directed by Luise Fleck and Jacob Fleck (Germany, 1927, based on the operetta Der Orlow)
 , directed by Max Neufeld (Germany, 1932, based on the operetta Der Orlow)
 The Queen's Affair, directed by Herbert Wilcox (UK, 1934, based on the operetta Die Königin)

Screenwriter and Composer
  The Forester's Daughter (Germany, 1931, dir: Frederic Zelnik)
 Walzerparadies (Germany, 1931, dir: Frederic Zelnik)
 Companion Wanted (French-language version, 1932, dir: Joe May)
 Two in a Car (German-language version, 1932, dir: Joe May)
 The Company's in Love (Germany, 1932, dir. Max Ophüls)

Composer
 The Magic Top Hat (Germany, 1932, dir. Rudolf Bernauer)

External links 

 
 Stage works
  Works catalog
  Short biography and list of works
  Stefan Frey: Short biography
  Guy Wagner: Ein Fall unter vielen. Bruno Granichstaedten

1879 births
1944 deaths
American composers
American male composers
American people of Austrian-Jewish descent
Austrian composers
Austrian male composers
Austrian operetta librettists
Austrian male writers
Austrian emigrants to the United States
Musicians from Vienna